Junction is an unincorporated community in Hampshire County in the U.S. state of West Virginia. Historically referred to as Moorefield Junction, Junction received its name because of its location at the crossroads of U.S. Route 220/West Virginia Route 28 and the Northwestern Turnpike (U.S. Route 50). The community is located along Mill Creek.

Historic sites 
Sloan–Parker House (1790), Northwestern Turnpike (US 50)
Trinity Church, Trinity Road (CR 220/11)

References

Unincorporated communities in Hampshire County, West Virginia
Unincorporated communities in West Virginia
Northwestern Turnpike